The following is a list of commonly used chord progressions in music.

Further reading
 R., Ken (2012). DOG EAR Tritone Substitution for Jazz Guitar, Amazon Digital Services, Inc., ASIN: B008FRWNIW.

See also
 List of musical intervals
 List of pitch intervals
List of musical scales and modes
Cadence (music)

 
Chord progressions
Music theory